Yes Sir, I Will was the fifth and penultimate album released in March 1983 by anarcho-punk band Crass.  The album is a virulent attack on then-Prime Minister of the United Kingdom Margaret Thatcher and her government in the aftermath of the Falklands War and was set nearly wholly over a raging and an almost free-form improvised backing provided by the group's musicians.

Content
Many of the lyrics from this album are extracted from Penny Rimbaud's extended poem Rocky Eyed. The original vinyl release presented the contents as one long piece split over both sides with no banding between songs, making it the longest punk rock song ever recorded.

Rimbaud summarised the album in an interview with Radio Free France:

Sleeve notes for the album include parts of Rimbaud's article The Pig's Head Controversy that originally appeared in the Crass-produced magazine International Anthem.

The title, taken from a news report of a conversation between Charles, Prince of Wales and Falklands War veteran Simon Weston, is an ironic criticism. Charles, visiting the extensively, permanently burned Weston in the hospital, dryly told him to "Get well soon" and Weston's sincere reply is the album's cynical title. Rimbaud, commenting on this, has said, "That was the hook. That was such an audacious thing to do at the time. Especially given that one had to feel compassion for Simon Weston."

The album has an extreme disparity between the aggression of the music and the peacefulness of the message. In an interview about the nature of the anger that often crossed between passion and aggression on the album, Gee Vaucher said:

Rereleases
A film made by Crass member Gee Vaucher to accompany Yes Sir, I Will was shown at the UK National Film Theatre's Stuff the Jubilee festival of punk films in 2002, and the track was remixed in 2002 by Rimbaud to incorporate additional jazz instrumentation provided by Ingrid Laubrock (saxophone) and Julian Siegel (double bass) to augment the original performance.

The Crassical Collection version of this release, including new artwork by Vaucher, remastered sound and liner notes by Steve Ignorant and Rimbaud, was released on May 17, 2011. The reissue also contains a second disc (entitled Why Don't You Fuck Off?), which has Rimbaud's 2002 remix of the album, featuring Laubrock and Seigal. No track titles appeared on the original versions of the album; however, the Crassical Collection edition gave the tracks titles. The first disc of the Crassical Collection edition is indexed incorrectly, with some tracks being shown longer or shorter than they were on the original release on the CD player's display, however the second disc is indexed correctly.

Track listing

Personnel
Steve Ignorant - vocals
Joy De Vivre - vocals
Phil Free - guitar
Gee Vaucher - voices, artwork
Eve Libertine - vocals
N. A. Palmer - rhythm guitar, vocals, voices
Penny Rimbaud - drums, vocals
Pete Wright - bass guitar
Paul Ellis - piano, strings
Crass - producer
John Loder - engineer
Judy - typing

Quotes
 "Be warned! The nature of your oppression is the aesthetic of our anger" - Crass, Yes Sir, I Will album cover (1983)
 "You must learn to live with your own conscience, your own morality, your own decision, your own self. You alone can do it. There is no authority but yourself." - Crass, Yes Sir, I Will (1983)
 "The listener experiences and shares the performer's exhaustion as voices crack, the beat wanders, energy flags and returns" - George McKay describing the album in Senseless Acts of Beauty (Verso, 1996)

References

Crass albums
Crass Records albums
1983 albums